The women's futsal tournament at the 2021 Southeast Asian Games was held from 15 to 19 May in Vietnam. In this tournament, 4 Southeast Asian teams played in the women's competition. Indonesia withdrew from the competition after the draw.

All matches were played at Hà Nam Gymnasium in Phủ Lý, Hà Nam.

Competition schedule
The following was the competition schedule for the women's futsal competitions:

Venue

Participating nations
The following four teams participated for the competition.

  (MAS)
  (MYA)
  (THA)
  (VIE)

Match officials

Draw
There is no official draw since only 4 teams participating in this competition. All teams are automatically drawn to one group.

Competition format
Round robin; the team with the best record wins the gold medal.

Final ranking

Results 
All times are Vietnam Standard Time (UTC+7).

Goalscorers

See also
 Futsal at the 2021 Southeast Asian Games 
 Futsal at the 2021 Southeast Asian Games - Men's tournament 
 2021 Southeast Asian Games

References

Futsal at the 2021 Southeast Asian Games